Molins-sur-Aube (literally Molins on Aube) is a commune in the Aube department in north-central France.

Population
In 2017, the municipality had 108 inhabitants.

See also
Communes of the Aube department
Parc naturel régional de la Forêt d'Orient

References

Communes of Aube
Aube communes articles needing translation from French Wikipedia